Joe Haeg (born March 11, 1993) is an American football offensive tackle for the Cleveland Browns of the National Football League (NFL). He played college football at North Dakota State and was drafted by the Indianapolis Colts in the fifth round (155th overall) of the 2016 NFL Draft. He has also played for the Tampa Bay Buccaneers, and won Super Bowl LV with the team over the Kansas City Chiefs.

Professional career

Indianapolis Colts
Haeg was drafted in the fifth round with the 155th overall pick in the 2016 NFL Draft by the Indianapolis Colts. He signed his rookie contract with the Colts on May 5, 2016. He played in 15 games with 14 starts as a rookie for the Colts. In 2017, he played in all 16 games, starting 15 at right tackle and right guard.

In 2018, Haeg started two games at right tackle and one at left tackle before suffering an ankle injury in Week 3. He was placed on injured reserve on September 28, 2018. He was activated off injured reserve on December 1, 2018. He started two games at right guard upon his return in place of an injured Mark Glowinski.

Tampa Bay Buccaneers
On March 21, 2020, Haeg signed a one-year deal with the Tampa Bay Buccaneers. Haeg appeared in 12 games and started three in the 2020 season. Haeg played in Super Bowl LV, a 31–9 victory over the Kansas City Chiefs. He was targeted on a trick play that almost resulted in a touchdown reception but ended up as an incomplete pass.

Pittsburgh Steelers
Haeg signed a two-year contract with the Pittsburgh Steelers on March 24, 2021. He was released on August 30, 2022.

Cleveland Browns
On September 4, 2022, Haeg signed with the Cleveland Browns. He was placed on injured reserve on October 29.

NFL career statistics

References

External links
 Tampa Bay Buccaneers bio
 North Dakota State Bison bio

1993 births
Living people
People from Brainerd, Minnesota
Players of American football from Minnesota
American football offensive linemen
North Dakota State Bison football players
Indianapolis Colts players
Tampa Bay Buccaneers players
Pittsburgh Steelers players
Cleveland Browns players